Montvalent is a commune in the Lot department in south-western France.

Geography
Montvalent is located in the north of the Lot. It is situated on the D840 between the towns of Martel and Gramat. The commune is in the valley of the river Dordogne, and is easily reached from the autoroute A20 (Junctions 54, Martel or 55, Souillac).

Demography
The inhabitants of Monvalent are known as Monvalentais.

Places and monuments
At the bottom of the cliffs below the village of Montvalent, the underground river from the Gouffre de Padirac resurfaces near the Dordogne.

Montvalent is just 10 minutes by car to the famous pilgrimage site of Rocamadour and pilgrims often stopped in the village on their way.

See also
Communes of the Lot department

References

Communes of Lot (department)